The Citadel is a public military college in Charleston, South Carolina.

The Citadel may also refer to:

Arts, entertainment, and media

Film and television
The Citadel (1938 film), based on the Cronin novel
The Citadel (1960 film), a 1960 American television film adaptation
The Citadel (1960 TV series), a 1960 British serial adaptation of the Cronin novel
The Citadel (1983 TV series), a 1983 British serial adaptation for the BBC
The Citadel (2003 miniseries) or La Cittadella, an Italian adaptation
La Cittadella (1964 miniseries), a 1964 Italian adaptation of The Citadel

Literature
The Citadel (novel), a 1937 novel by A. J. Cronin
The Citadel, a novel by Peter Aleshkovsky
The Citadel, a Dragonlance novel by Richard A. Knaak, in the Classics Series

Video games
The Citadel, a Combine headquarters on Earth's City 17 in the game Half-Life 2
The Citadel (Mass Effect), an immense space station and the heart of galactic civilization in the Mass Effect game series
The Citadel, the headquarters of the Brotherhood of Steel in the ruins of the Pentagon in Fallout 3

Places

Geography
The Citadel (Arizona), an archaeological site at the Wupatki National Monument
The Citadel (mountain), a mountain in South West Tasmania
The Citadel (Sierra Nevada), a mountain summit in California

Structures and institutions
 Royal Citadel, Plymouth, regularly referred to as "The Citadel"
Citadel of Aleppo, a palace in Aleppo, Syria
The Citadel (mall), a shopping mall in Colorado, United States
Citadel Outlets, an outlet mall in City of Commerce, Los Angeles County, California
The Citadel, one of the tallest buildings in Dubai
The Citadel, the Vietnamese royal residence at Hué
The Citadel, 17th century artillery fort, Kingston upon Hull, UK
Citadel Arts Centre, in St Helens, Merseyside now referred to as "The Citadel Arts Centre"
 Kastellet, Copenhagen, also called the Citadel, a 17th-century citadel in Copenhagen, Denmark
The Citadel Airport, a private airport near Sisters, Oregon, United States

Sports
 The Citadel Bulldogs, the athletic programs of The Citadel college

See also
Citadel (disambiguation)
Citadella, fortress on Gellért Hill, Budapest, Hungary
Citadelle (disambiguation)
Cittadella (disambiguation)
Royal Citadel (disambiguation)
Tower of David